Phu or variation, may refer to:

Places
Phủ, prefecture in 15th–19th century Vietnam

People

Given name
Phu Dorjee (died 1987), first Indian to climb Mount Everest without oxygen
Phu Dorjee Sherpa (died 1969), first Nepali to climb Mount Everest
Phu Lam (1961–2014), perpetrator in the 2014 Edmonton killings
Trần Phú (1904–1931), Vietnamese communist revolutionary
Trương Phụ (1375–1449), general of the Ming Dynasty of China

Surname
Charles Phu, architect and set designer
Phu Pwint Khaing (born 1987), Burmese soccer player
Sunthorn Phu (1786–1855), Siamese poet

Linguistics
Phuan language (ISO 639 language code: phu)
Phu Thai language, the Phu language of Thais
Nar Phu language, the Nar and the Phu languages

Other uses
Public Health Units of Ontario, Canada
Pannon Air Service (ICAO airline code: PHU), see List of airline codes (P)

See also

 
 Phoo
 Foo (disambiguation)
 Fu (disambiguation)